The variegated antpitta (Grallaria varia) is a species of bird in the family Grallariidae.
It is found in southeastern Brazil, eastern Paraguay, the Guianas and the northern Amazon Basin. Its range extends to Venezuela in the northwest; in the Amazon Basin, it is found in the downstream half of the basin, as well as in the Atlantic outlet region of the neighboring Tocantins-Araguaia River drainage to the southeast. A minor disjunct population is in Peru, and an Argentinian population is found in the tongue of land between Paraguay and southern Brazil.

Its natural habitats are subtropical or tropical moist lowland forest and subtropical or tropical moist montane forest.

Taxonomy
The variegated antpitta was described by the French polymath Georges-Louis Leclerc, Comte de Buffon in 1780 in his Histoire Naturelle des Oiseaux from a specimen collected in Cayenne, French Guiana. The bird was also illustrated in a hand-coloured plate engraved by François-Nicolas Martinet in the Planches Enluminées D'Histoire Naturelle which was produced under the supervision of Edme-Louis Daubenton to accompany Buffon's text.  Neither the plate caption nor Buffon's description included a scientific name but in 1783 the Dutch naturalist Pieter Boddaert coined the binomial name Formicarius varius in his catalogue of the Planches Enluminées. The variegated antpitta is now placed in the genus Grallaria that was introduced by the French ornithologist Louis Jean Pierre Vieillot in 1816. The genus name is from New Latin grallarius meaning "stilt-walker". The specific epithet varia is from Latin varius meaning "various", "diverse" or "variegated".

Five subspecies are recognised:
 G. v. cinereiceps Hellmayr, 1903 – south Venezuela, northwest Brazil and northeast Peru
 G. v. varia (Boddaert, 1783) – east Venezuela, the Guianas and northeast Brazil
 G. v. distincta Todd, 1927 – central Brazil
 G. v. intercedens von Berlepsch & Leverkühn, 1890 – east Brazil
 G. v. imperator Lafresnaye, 1842 – southeast Brazil, east Paraguay and northeast Argentina

References

External links
Xeno-canto: audio recordings of the variegated antpitta
Variegated antpitta photo gallery VIREO Photo-High Res
Photo-High Res; Article fieldmuseum.org–"Rapid Biological Inventories"
Graphic-Medium Res & Article www.sib.gov.ar/fichas/fauna

variegated antpitta
Birds of the Amazon Basin
Birds of the Atlantic Forest
Birds of the Guianas
variegated antpitta
Taxonomy articles created by Polbot